Anhinga walterbolesi  is an extinct species of darter from the Late Oligocene to Early Miocene of Australia. It was described from fossil material (a left tarsometatarsus) collected in 1982 from the Etadunna Formation of the Snake Dam site, in the Lake Eyre Basin of north-eastern South Australia. The specific epithet honours Australian palaeontologist Walter Boles for his contributions to Australian palaeornithology.

References

Fossil taxa described in 2012
Birds described in 2012
Anhingidae
Oligocene birds
Miocene birds
Oligocene birds of Australia
Miocene birds of Australia